IBF Arena is an indoor sports arena in Ikast, Denmark primarily used for handball. It can hold 2,550 spectators (with a further 300 in a standing area if needed) and is home to Herning-Ikast Håndbold. Until June 2008 it was called Sportscenter Ikast.

References 

Handball venues in Denmark
Indoor arenas in Denmark
Ikast-Brande Municipality
Buildings and structures in the Central Denmark Region